The 1997 Argentina rugby union tour of New Zealand  was a series of five matches played by the Argentina national rugby union team in June 1996. The young Argentinian team lost both test matches against the All Blacks.

Matches
Scores and results list Argentina's points tally first.

Sources

1997
1997
1997 in New Zealand rugby union
1997 in Argentine rugby union